Charles III is an album by organist Charles Earland which was recorded in 1972 and 1973 and released on the Prestige label.

Reception

Allmusic awarded the album 3 stars.

Track listing 
All compositions by Charles Earland except where noted.
 "Charles III" – 6:20   
 "Girl, You Need a Change Of Mind" (Leonard Caston, Jr., Anita Poree) – 5:00   
 "Auburn Delight" – 8:35   
 "Lowdown" (Peter Cetera, Danny Seraphine) – 8:20   
 "My Favorite Things" (Oscar Hammerstein II, Richard Rodgers) – 6:00   
 "Speedball" (Lee Morgan) – 5:19

Personnel 
Charles Earland – organ, electric piano, soprano saxophone, percussion
Jon Faddis, Virgil Jones, Lee Morgan, Victor Paz, Joe Shepley, Richard Williams – trumpet, flugelhorn
Garnett Brown, Dick Griffin – trombone 
Jack Jeffers – trombone, tuba 
Billy Harper – tenor saxophone, alto flute
Seldon Powell – baritone saxophone, alto flute
John Fourie, Greg Millar, Maynard Parker – guitar
Stuart Scharf – acoustic guitar
Jack Turner – guitar, percussion   
Billy Cobham – drums 
Darryl Washington – drums, percussion
Larry Killian – percussion
Sonny Morgan – congas 
Joe Lee Wilson – vocals

References 

Charles Earland albums
1973 albums
Prestige Records albums
Albums recorded at Van Gelder Studio